Mike Frank Russell (born 1977) is an Irish sportsperson. He plays Gaelic football with his local club Laune Rangers and was a member at senior level of the Kerry county team from 1997 until 2009.

Early life
Born in Killorglin, County Kerry in 1977, Russell was educated at Scoil Mhuire national school before later attending the Intermediate School in Killorglin. It was here that Russell's football skills were first developed and he became a key member of the school's senior team. In 1996 he captured a Corn Uí Mhuirí winners' medal as the Killorglin school captured the Munster colleges' title. An All-Ireland colleges' final appearance beckoned for Russell's side with St Patrick's of Maghera providing the opposition. Killorglin went on a goal scoring spree and proved more than a match for the point-scoring abilities of St Pat's. A 4-8 to 1-14 score line gave Killorglin the win and gave Russell an All-Ireland colleges' winners' medal.

Russell currently works as a teacher in Mercy Holy Cross primary school in Killarney. In 2009, he married Sinead O'Brien in Killorglin.

Playing career

College
Russell attended the Institute of Technology, Tralee (ITT), where he lined out with the institute's senior football team and enjoyed some success. In the 1997-98 season his side reached the final of the inter-varsities football competition. The University of Ulster provided the opposition on that occasion in Austin Stack Park; however, ITT won the game by 0-10 to 0-8, giving Russell a Sigerson Cup winners' medal.

Inter-county
Russell made his debut for Kerry in the 1997 season. He became a key forward for Kerry over the next decade, winning a total of five All-Ireland medals with Kerry. He was also selected for the All-Star team in 2000. He retired from inter-county football in 2009. Went to New York for the summer 2009 to play for Roscommon New York who won the Championship

Honours

Ireland
International Rules Series (1)
 2001 (sub)

Munster
Railway Cup
runner-up 2007

Kerry
All-Ireland Senior Football Championship (5)
 1997, 2000, 2004, 2006, 2007; runner-up 2002, 2005, 2008
Munster Senior Football Championship (8)
 1997, 1998, 2000, 2001, 2003, 2004, 2005, 2007; runner-up 1999, 2006, 2008
National Football League (Division 1) (4)
 1996-97, 2004, 2006, 2009 (sub)
National Football League (Division 2) (1)
2002
All-Ireland Under-21 Football Championship (2)
1996, 1998
Munster Under-21 Football Championship (3)
 1996 (sub), 1997, 1998 (sub)
All-Ireland Minor Football Championship (1)
 1994
Munster Minor Football Championship (1)
 1994

Intermediate School Killorglin
All-Ireland Senior Colleges' Football Championship (1)
 1996
Munster Senior Colleges' Football Championship (1)
1996

Institute of Technology, Tralee
Sigerson Cup (1)
1997-98

Laune Rangers
All-Ireland Senior Club Football Championship (1)
 1996 (sub)
Munster Senior Club Football Championship (1)
 1995 (sub), 1996
Kerry Senior Football Championship (2)
 1995 (sub), 1996; runner-up 1997, 2003, 2004
Kerry Under-21 Football Championship (1)
 1995
Kerry Minor Football Championship (1)
 1995
Kerry County Football League – Division 1 (4)
 1995, 1996, 1997, 1998

Awards
'''GAA GPA All Stars Awards (1)
2000

References

1977 births
Living people
All Stars Awards winners (football)
All Stars Young Footballers of the Year
Alumni of Institute of Technology, Tralee
Irish international rules football players
Irish schoolteachers
Kerry inter-county Gaelic footballers
Laune Rangers Gaelic footballers
People from Killorglin
Winners of five All-Ireland medals (Gaelic football)